Andrew Neil Buchan (born 19 February 1979) is an English actor and writer. He is known for his roles as Mark Latimer in the ITV drama Broadchurch (2013–17), Scott Foster in the BBC political drama Party Animals (2007), John Mercer in ITV drama series The Fixer (2008–09), and William Garrow in BBC period drama Garrow's Law (2009–11).

Early life
Buchan was born in Stockport and brought up in the suburb of Lostock, Bolton. He attended the nearby Rivington and Blackrod High School where he was head boy during sixth form years in Horwich.

During A-Levels, Buchan worked for Granada Studios as a tour guide, using amusing, unconventional methods to keep tourists interested. He also worked as a barman at Manchester Airport, as a concierge at the De Vere Whites hotel in Reebok Stadium, and as a labourer for several months in Italy.

In 2001, Buchan graduated from St Cuthbert's Society, Durham University with a Bachelor of Arts in Modern Languages. He then trained the Royal Academy of Dramatic Art (RADA).

Career
On the stage he has appeared as Mercutio in Romeo and Juliet at the Royal Exchange Theatre, Manchester (2005). In 2008, he appeared in Arthur Miller's The Man Who Had All the Luck at Donmar Warehouse. The play ran for six weeks in London, before going on a short UK tour. Buchan was named Best Actor in a Touring Production by the Manchester Evening News Theatre Awards. In 2011, he returned to the Donmar to play Bolingbroke in Shakespeare's Richard II.

His career in television began in 2006 when he appeared as the vicar, St. John Rivers, in the 2006 Jane Eyre and then as the regular character Scott Foster alongside Matt Smith in the political drama Party Animals. In 2007, he appeared as Jem Hearne in the award-winning Cranford, in a cast that included Judi Dench, Imelda Staunton and Eileen Atkins. Also in 2007, he appeared as the teacher 'Sean Knowles', with Richard Coyle and Indira Varma in ITV's The Whistleblowers. In 2008, he appeared in Season 4, Episode 1 of Bones as Dr. Ian Wexler.

In 2008 and 2009, he starred in the ITV1 drama The Fixer as the lead role, John Mercer, a paid assassin targeting people who have escaped the law. The first season of The Fixer received a Royal Television Society award for Best Series. In 2009, he appeared as Fishwick in the John Lennon biopic Nowhere Boy acting opposite Kristin Scott Thomas, and directed by Sam Taylor-Wood. In the BBC's Garrow's Law, he starred in the leading role as William Garrow. Series 1 started on BBC One on 1 November 2009, and continued for two more series. In December 2009, he appeared again as the carpenter Jem Hearne in the BBC's two-part Cranford Christmas Special.

In 2010, Buchan appeared as journalist and love interest Billy Marshall in the made-for-TV movie Abroad, based in part on the true-life experiences of Toronto's Globe and Mail columnist and author, Leah McLaren. This movie was broadcast in Canada on CBC TV on 14 March 2010. In 2010, he appeared as Joseph in the BBC's The Nativity. On 6 and 7 January 2011, he appeared in a dramatisation of the Laconia incident on BBC Television.

In 2013, he starred in multi-award-winning ITV drama, Broadchurch, as Mark Latimer, father of the murdered boy Danny Latimer. For this role he was awarded the best supporting actor "Dagger" at the Crime Thriller Awards 2013. The immediate ratings success of Broadchurch led to Andrew, with co-star Jodie Whittaker, being invited to present a TV BAFTA at the awards ceremony in May 2013. That same month his film, Having You, was premiered on Sky Movies. In this bittersweet comedy about commitment and responsibility, Buchan played the lead character Jack, alongside Romola Garai as his girlfriend, and Anna Friel as a one-night stand from his past.

2013 also saw the release of multi-award-winning independent film Still Life, in which Andrew took a cameo role alongside Eddie Marsan. Later the same year, Buchan produced and starred in film short, 1946, based on the life of Hollywood actor, Jimmy Stewart. The film won the Award of Distinction at the 2014 Williamsburg Independent Film Festival.

In July 2014, Buchan starred alongside Academy Award nominee Maggie Gyllenhaal in Hugo Blick's eagerly anticipated political thriller The Honourable Woman. This was broadcast on both BBC2 in the UK and the Sundance channel in the USA. In October 2014, he starred in ITV's The Great Fire, portraying Thomas Farriner, the baker from Pudding Lane.

In 2015, it was announced that Buchan was cast as the lead role in TNT drama pilot Home alongside Bethany Joy Lenz. Unfortunately Home was not subsequently serialised and remains unaired.

On Christmas Day 2016, the lavish dramatisation of Jasper Fforde's fantasy novel The Last Dragonslayer premiered on Sky One, featuring Buchan in the role of wizard, The Great Zambini. The following Christmas saw the high-profile release of Ridley Scott's All the Money in the World - the story of the kidnap of John Paul Getty III, grandson of billionaire John Paul Getty.  Andrew played John Paul Getty II, father of the kidnapped boy, son of JPG, and husband to Gail Getty, played by Michelle Williams. Some of Andrew's scenes had been re-shot when Christopher Plummer replaced the disgraced Kevin Spacey as JPG just one month earlier.

In February 2018, Andrew was seen in a cameo part in James Marsh's The Mercy – a BBC film about ill-fated 1960s yachtsman Donald Crowhurst, featuring Colin Firth and Rachel Weisz in the lead roles. Later that same year, and wearing substantial prosthetic enhancements, he was seen as Henri Matisse in National Geographic's 2nd season series Genius: Picasso, playing alongside Antonio Banderas and Clémence Poésy. At Christmas 2018, he starred in Agatha Christie's The ABC Murders adapted by Sarah Phelps on BBC. He played Franklin Clarke, alongside John Malkovich as Hercule Poirot and Rupert Grint as Inspector Crome.

In 2019, Andrew featured in the third series of The Crown, as Andrew Parker-Bowles, a friend and a rival of royal family members. He continued playing the role in the fourth series that finished filming in March 2020. In addition, Andrew appeared in two films: Intrigo: Samaria alongside Phoebe Fox and Millie Brady and Baghdad in My Shadow by Swiss/Iraqi filmmaker Samir alongside Zahraa Ghandour.

In addition to stage, television and film, Buchan has built up an extensive voice acting catalogue. He has appeared in BBC Radio drama, Dickens Confidential, and radio dramatisations of Therese Raquin and The Great Gatsby. He has read prose and poetry on BBC Radio for Words and Music: Law and Order and Ave Maria, as well as featuring in on-line role-playing games, audio books, advert voiceovers and narrating TV documentaries and reality-competition shows, such as Britain's Best Home Cook.

Personal life
Buchan married his long-term girlfriend, actress Amy Nuttall, on 8 September 2012, not far from their respective childhood homes in Lancashire, England. The couple had been together since 2007. They have two children, a daughter and a son.

Filmography

Film

Television

Stage

Awards and nominations

Notes

References

External links

Living people
1979 births
21st-century English male actors
Actors from Bolton
Actors from Stockport
Alumni of RADA
Alumni of St Cuthbert's Society, Durham
English male stage actors
English male television actors